Crook: It's Good to be Bad is a 2010 Indian Hindi-language action thriller film directed by Mohit Suri and produced by Mukesh Bhatt. The film stars Emraan Hashmi, Neha Sharma and Arjan Bajwa in the lead. It was released on 8 October 2010. Mostly shot in Australia and South Africa, the film is based on the controversy regarding the allegedly racial attacks on Indian students in Australia between 2007 and 2010.

Plot

Jai Dixit, is a young adult who sells pirated DVDs in Mumbai. One day, his uncle Joseph catches him, and this changes his personality completely, he changes his name to Suraj Bhardwaj, and his uncle sends him to Melbourne . At the airport, he meets Romi Latti, an International Graduate student originally from Gurdaspur who got a scholarship to a University College. He also meets Suhani, a girl who has come to pick Romi up. Suraj is attracted to Suhani, and therefore he pretends to be Romi and leaves with Suhani. When Suhani finds out that he is not the real Romi, Suraj makes a run for it. Suraj then stays with Goldie, a responsible adult living with his brothers. While Suraj is at a grocery store, on the phone with his uncle Joseph, he finds that Australians are attacking the shopkeeper because he is a Muslim, so Suraj finds a gun and comes out. He has the Australians on the gunpoint as the police arrive. Suraj remembers that his uncle told him not to get in any type of trouble with the police, so Suraj runs away. Suraj hides in Nicole's car, although he finds out Nicole is the younger sister of the Attackers. Nicole works in a strip club named 'Duke's Club'. Suraj and Suhani had a dispute due to which he makes out with Nicole in a club. Nicole proposes to Jai, and he reciprocates, due to being aroused. But later, when Suraj has to pick between Suhani and Nicole, he picks Suhani and takes the duty to be Suhani's brother, Samarth's (Arjan Bajwa) driver. When Samarth's car breaks down, Suraj has to get help, but instead, he tells Romi to go and fix his car so Suhani and Suraj can have a beautiful night together. But when they are about to kiss, Samarth shows up, and concepts that Romi has been badly beaten up by Australians on the highway and Romi and Samarth are about to protest against the Australians.

When Samarth is attacked, he loses his temper and kidnaps Nicole causing an unrest in entire Melbourne as Nicole's brother attempts to try to find her. He captures Suhani in retaliation. When Suraj goes to save Nicole, it turns out that Samarth is planning to murder Nicole and blame the murder on Suraj. When Suraj learns of Samarth's plan, Samarth beats Suraj and tells him that he is doing all this because his sister Sheena was also murdered by the Australians once (Actually, Sheena was in love with an Australian and she became pregnant with his child, which infuriated Samarth and he decides to abort the child, despite knowing the fact that she will die because of it, due to the abortion she ends up dead). But when he accidentally shoots Suraj, Romi comes up behind him with a shovel and hits it on Samarth's head, and he dies. The unrest in city stops when the news breaks out that Nicole is alive, and the Indians and Australians both unite for peace.
The film ends with Suraj being felicitated in front of the media with Suhani by his side as Uncle Joseph gets touched after seeing the news in Mumbai.

Cast
Emraan Hashmi as Jai Dixit (real name)/ Suraj Bhardwaj (fake name), Suhani's love interest and Mahesh's son
Neha Sharma as Suhani, Jai's love interest and Samarth's sister
Shella Allen as Nicole, Russell's younger sister
Arjan Bajwa as Samarth, Suhani and Sheena's brother
Dane Merrick as himself
Mashhoor Amrohi as Goldie
Kavin Dave as Romi Latti
  Yash Acharya as Child Artist
Gulshan Grover as Joseph
 Francis Chouler as Russell, Nicole's elder brother (as Francis Michael Chouler)
Smiley Suri as Sheena, Suhani and Samarth's sister (Special Appearance)
 J Brandon Hill as Sgt Damien Stern
 Glen David Short as Chief of Police
 Vineet Kumar Singh as Mahesh Dixit, Jai's father

Elan Davidson (David)

Soundtrack

The songs were composed by Pritam and the lyrics were penned by Kumaar. The song, Challa was based on the song Australian Challa by Babbal Rai. The song "Mere Bina" topped the charts everywhere. The Film's background score was composed by Raju Singh.

Track listing

Reception
Atta Khan from planet Bollywood rated the album 7/10 and said, "The music of Crook is another rendezvous to Pritam's rock annals and the first album to do that since last year’s awesome Tum Mile. But it's a much shorter album with only four original songs and only two of these being rock anthems so it doesn't quite match Tum Mile's soundtrack for depth, quality, and consistency. However whilst "Challa" and "Kya" will not be missed, "Mere Bina" and "Tujhi Mein" are a MUST listen for fans and you know who you are. Furthermore, the remixes at Tracks 5-8 are simply superb! So forget about the prospects of Crook as a film- when you have music that sounds this enjoyable you can only call this (Bhatt/Pritam) collaboration special and we await their next soundtrack with  breath. And yes, Pritam has satisfied once again."
NDTV India quoted, "Music composer Pritam Chakraborty, who is a favourite of the Bhatt camp, brings forth another likable soundtrack in forthcoming film Crook. Even though the compositions fall under his signature style and not much experimentation is involved, the tracks do have the potential of getting noticed."

Critical reception

India
The reception of the film in India has been mixed. The critics praised the story and music but criticized the execution. However, many of them praised the erotic scenes between Emraan Hashmi and Shella Allen. The scenes have become quite popular as well.
One critic writes praises the music, writing: "this along with its already popular songs makes Crook a full on entertainment package that should not be missed when it releases all over on 8 October". Movie critic Taran Adarsh, criticized the film as a "half-hearted effort", but praises Mohit Suri's handling of the subject during the second hour of the film. Another critic praised the film for presenting "an altogether different approach to the situation and (the director) takes both the sides and speaks in favour of Indians and as well as the Australians.

Among negative reviews, a critic at India Today complained that the film racially vilifies Australians as:

Also that "it is badly directed and doesn't even have that one redeeming feature of all"

A critic at Rediff.com complained of a weak script and story line. A reviewer at bollyspice.com said that the film was "too insensitive" and "superficial".

Australia
One media outlet in Australia voiced concern about the film, repeating Indian newspaper reviews that Crook portrayed Australia as  "A country of ex-convicts. A country where they sleep with each other without marrying. A country where they don't take care of their families. Yes that's the sort of venom that's spewed against the Australians in Crook."

Among Australia's local Indian population, Gautam Gupta, spokesman for the Federation of Indian Students criticized the piece, saying: "They have performed their research so badly, it's shocking." He also complained that, far from helping the situation, that the film could help inflame tensions.

Director Mohit Suri responded to these charges, rejecting the claims of bias. The Hindustan Times quoted Suri saying:

Responding to allegations that the film is "poorly researched", Suri says, "I have just made a film. At 28, don’t expect me to have a cure for racism worldwide. I have just expressed my opinion."

Suri also complained that during the production of the film:

Awards and nominations

6th Apsara Film & Television Producers Guild Awards
Nominated
 Apsara Award for Best Music - Pritam
 Apsara Award for Best Performance in a Negative Role - Arjan Bajwa

3rd Mirchi Music Awards
Nominated
 Best Programmer & Arranger of the Year - Jim Satya, Johan Folke and DJ Phukan - "Mere Bina"

References

External links

2010 films
2010s Hindi-language films
2010 action thriller films
Indian action thriller films
Films shot in Australia
Films featuring songs by Pritam
Films about racism
Films set in Australia
Films directed by Mohit Suri